Emilia Galińska (born 26 December 1992) is a Polish handball player for MKS Zagłębie Lubin and the Polish national team.

She participated at the 2016 European Women's Handball Championship.

References

1992 births
Living people
Polish female handball players
People from Łuków
21st-century Polish women